The Infernal Noise Brigade was a Seattle, Washington-based musical group, who originally formed to participate in the protests at the WTO Meeting of 1999. Over its seven-year history, the group performed as part of several large-scale protest actions, such as those at the 2000 IMF/World Bank Meeting in Prague, the 2003 WTO Ministerial in Cancún, Mexico, the 2004 United States Republican Party National Convention in New York City, as well as at numerous events in their homebase of Seattle. In July 2005, they participated in the protests against the 31st G8 summit in Scotland as part of a European tour that also brought them to England, Germany, the Netherlands, Belgium, and Austria.

Their website describes their music as combining "elements of drumline, taiko, Mughal and North African rhythms, elements of Balkan fanfares, breakbeats, and just about anything else." Although best known for their free (and often confrontational) public performances at political protests, they sometimes performed at more conventional concerts and club gigs, usually featured as part of a musically eclectic program.

Christopher Frizzelle, in an "obituary" for the band in the Seattle-based arts weekly The Stranger, remarked that their "most important and dramatic public events were standoffs with cops" and that they "can be credited for keeping WTO protestors energized, focused, and photogenic… What their parties and their protests had in common was intensity, vividness, and a fun, frightening sense that anything could happen. They were lessons in liberation."

Frizzelle, who travelled with INB on a portion of their European tour, wrote in his review of that tour that the members used "band names", partly to "retain the mystery of the band" and partly to preserve their anonymity from their employers: almost none of the band members are professional musicians. As example, Frizzelle provided the roster from the mainland portion of the European tour: "Annemat, Atomika, B. Q. (whose band name is Red Dot, but no one calls her that), Bluer Than You, Bookworm, Brassbelle, D. P. Punkass ("My whole name is Dread Pirate Punkass, but in print I like to be D. P. Punkass"), DK Pan, Flash, Grey Filastine, Hawtpantz, Ice Frog, In Phase, Megor, Mildred, Mr. Rose, the Professor, Ramon, Satsuma, Skunk, Spider, and Violet."

The Infernal Noise Brigade officially disbanded on July 29, 2006.

Members of Infernal Noise Brigade went on to form Titanium Sporkestra.

Recordings
Insurgent Selections for Battery & Voice
Vamos a la Playa (live in Cancún), 2003
"L'étincelle"/"Manguera" (single), 2004
Final Report Volume 6
Final Report, 2008
Field Recordings Volume 7
(with Filastine) No G8 Japan Action Benefit, 2008
The Final Recordings 2009

See also
¡Tchkung!

Notes

External links
Official site
Organization: Ones to Watch, Stranger Genius Awards 2005, The Stranger, October 13 - October 19, 2005
Performance Picks: Infernal Noise Brigade, Seattle Weekly, March 22, 2006
J.B. Rabin, Beat the Band, Portland Mercury, September 4 - September 10, 2003
Alan Roden and Linda Summerhayes, They came looking for trouble. . they got their wish, Edinburgh Evening News, 5 July 2005.
Alex Nunns, The strange affair of the Gleneagles G8 demo, 7 July 2005, part of Red Pepper's G8 coverage.

Anti-globalization organizations
Musical groups established in 1999
Political music groups
American marching bands
Musical groups from Seattle
1999 establishments in Washington (state)